Detva District is a district of the Banská Bystrica Region in central Slovakia. Until 1918, most of the area belonged to the Zvolen county, apart from Látky, Podkriváň and Horný Tisovník in the south and east which formed part of the county of Nógrád.

Municipalities

References 

Districts of Slovakia
Geography of Banská Bystrica Region